The New Barbarians, known as The Barbarians, were an English rock band that played two concerts in Canada, eighteen shows across the United States in April and May 1979 and one show on January 16, 1980. In August 1979, the band also supported Led Zeppelin at the Knebworth Festival 1979. 

The group was formed and led by Rolling Stones and Faces guitarist Ronnie Wood, primarily to promote his latest LP Gimme Some Neck.  The line-up included Rolling Stones member Keith Richards, bassist Stanley Clarke, former Faces keyboardist Ian McLagan, Rolling Stones confederate and saxophonist Bobby Keys and drumme Zigaboo Modeliste of The Meters. For the Knebworth show Clarke was replaced on short notice by bassist Phil Chen, who had to learn all the songs in one day. The January 16, 1980 show in Milwaukee, Wisconsin was a "make-up date" to help the promoter recoup the cost of the damages caused by the riot.Keith Richards was replaced with Johnny Lee Schell, Reggie McBride was on bass and Andy Newmark on drums. MacKenzie Phillips provided backup vocals. 

The band played a mix of classic rock & roll, R&B, blues and country music, along with Ron Wood solo material and Jagger/Richards songs. Wood sang lead on most numbers (with Richards, McLagan and Clarke providing back-up vocals), as well as playing guitar, pedal steel, harmonica and saxophone.

The New Barbarians debuted as the Rolling Stones' support act at two charity concerts to benefit the CNIB at the Oshawa Civic Auditorium near Toronto, Ontario on 22 April 1979, fulfilling one of the conditions of Richards' 1978 sentence for possession of heroin. The band's eighteen-gig US tour followed.  They made news in Milwaukee, Wisconsin when fans rioted, apparently due to their expectation that the show would feature "special guests", who did not appear. 

In October 2006 Ronnie Wood's record label, Wooden Records, released a two-disc CD (followed a few months later by a triple LP set) of a New Barbarians concert at the (now former) Capital Centre in Landover, Maryland, entitled Buried Alive: Live in Maryland.

Typical set list
When The New Barbarians appeared as a support act (at the two Canadian shows and at Knebworth Fair) their performances featured shortened set lists, but most shows on their US tour included:

 "Sweet Little Rock & Roller" (Berry)
 "Buried Alive" (Wood)
 "F.U.C. Her" (Wood)
 "Mystifies Me" (Wood)
 "Infekshun" (Wood)
 "Rock Me Baby" (Broonzy/Crudup)
 "Sure the One You Need" (Jagger/Richards) - Richards on lead vocals
 "Lost and Lonely" (Wood)
 "Breathe On Me" (Wood)
 "Love in Vain" (Johnson)
 "Let's Go Steady Again" (Alexander) - Richards on lead vocals, Wood on saxophone
 "Apartment Number 9" (Paycheck/Austin) - Richards on piano and lead vocals, Wood on pedal steel
 "Honky Tonk Women" (Jagger/Richards)
 "Worried Life Blues" (Merriwether) - Richards on lead vocals
 "I Can Feel the Fire" (Wood)
 "Come to Realize" (Wood)
 "Am I Grooving You" (Russell/Barry) - Wood on harmonica
 "Seven Days" (Dylan)
 "Before They Make Me Run" (Jagger/Richards) - Richards on lead vocals
 "Jumpin' Jack Flash" (Jagger/Richards)

Discography
Albums :
 Buried Alive  - Live in Maryland (recorded May 4th 1979) - released 2006
 Wanted Dead or Alive (recorded at the Madison Square Garden, May 7th 1979) - released in 2016 as bootleg.
Single :
 New Barbarians - They offer nothing more than ear-to-ear violence! 10" record released 16 April 2016 as limited edition vinyl (Record Store Day), limited to 3,000 copies.

References

English rock music groups
The Rolling Stones